Straightaway is a 1933 American Pre-Code crime drama film directed by Otto Brower and starring Tim McCoy, Sue Carol, and William Bakewell.

References

External links
Straightaway at the Internet Movie Database

1933 films
American auto racing films
Films directed by Otto Brower
1933 crime drama films
American crime drama films
American black-and-white films
Columbia Pictures films
1930s American films
1930s English-language films